Japanese internment camp may refer to:

Internment of Japanese Americans in the United States during World War II
Internment of Japanese Canadians in Canada during World War II 
List of Japanese-run internment camps during World War II